Dominican art comprises all the visual arts and plastic arts made in Dominican Republic. Since ancient times, various groups have inhabited the island of Ayíti/Quisqueya (the indigenous names of the island), or Hispaniola (what the Spanish named the island); the history of its art is generally compartmentalized in the same three periods throughout Dominican history: pre-Hispanic or aboriginal Amerindian (500 BC to 1500 AD), Hispanic or colonial (1502 to 1821 AD), and the national or Dominican period (1844 to present day).

Archeological evidence for human populations on the island go back to around 6,000 years ago, when Archaic Age foragers arrived from South America to the Caribbean island. Going back to the origins of autochthonous art, corresponding to the stage known as prehistoric, primitive or pre-Hispanic, we find several ethnic groups that made up the aboriginal culture: Tainos, Igneris, Ciboneyes, Kalinago and Guanahatabeyes. Of all of them, Taino art was the majority and most widespread throughout the insular territory, leaving behind an abundance of pottery and ceramic structures.

The Taino era of the island came to end after Spanish invasion and colonization, which commenced when Christopher Columbus arrived on the coasts of the island in 1492, leading to their decimation from enslavement, genocide, and foreign diseases. The newly “discovered” island was given the name “La Española” (Hispaniola) and became the first permanent European colony established in the Americas, Santo Domingo, in 1498. In this early period, most artworks were produced in Spain for shipment to Santo Domingo. Much of this early art no longer survive, considering many owners emigrated with their art, countless storms destroyed towns and their works, and Francis Drake's sacking of Santo Domingo in 1586 led to the disappearance of a lot of early colonial art.

The painting movement in Dominican society is young, considering it begins to sow its first fruits in the initial days of the Independence of 1844. Since then, it has manifested in diverse forms and styles produced by the blend of Taino, European, and West African elements found in the culture. The most prominent styles throughout the country's history have been Romanticism, Costumbrismo, Impressionism, Neoclassicism, Naturalism, Expressionism, Surrealism, and Abstract art to name a few. Some the most well known Dominican artists are Jaime Colson, Yoryi Morel, Dario Suro, Celeste Woss y Gil, and Guillo Perez.

Aboriginal Taíno Art 

For millennia, the predominant inhabitants of Ayíti/Quisqueya were the Taíno civilization. They were an Arawak people indigenous to the Caribbean islands, whose ancestors settled some 2,500 years before Columbus, having migrated from South America and replacing an earlier Archaic age people that had been wiped out. The Taínos formed an agricultural society with myriad artistic expression, including music, dance, body art, poetic myths, and an abundant production of ceramics, pottery, and sculptures in the Chicoid style, distinguished by its expressive symbolic decoration with sculptural features of stylized anthropomorphic and zoomorphic representations.

Taino art tends to be highly religious, loaded with animism. Along with rich ceramic and pottery art, rock engravings, called petroglyphs, and rock paintings, called pictographs, are abundant throughout the country's caves and caverns, dating back to approximately 2,000 years ago, although Taíno cave art is difficult to differentiate from those of earlier cultures; the aboriginal rock art is not the work of a single settlement group, but rather the work of different groups throughout different moments of the island's history. According to Taíno creation myths, the first humans, with the sun and the moon, emerged from caves in a sacred mountain on the island. Caves were revered as holy places, and believed to be our world's connection to the underworld and where the dead would passage.

Of all the Antillean islands, Ayíti/Quisqueya appears to be the territory most abundant in petroglyphs, quantitatively and qualitatively. Moreover, the geographic distribution of the sites where rock/cave paintings are located correspond with the locations of historically intensive populations. Overall two artistic languages are employed: that of a realistic, naturalistic approach, or an abstract approach by way of symbols, schemes, and stylizations. Motifs or designs of these rock art are classified into several groups:

Anthropomorphic: drawings of human figures.

Zoomorphs: animal representations.

Anthropozoomorphs: figuration that combines humans and animals.

Phytomorphs: figures of plants, flowers, fruits, etc.

Mytomorphs: representations of myths, legend, others.

Asteromorphs: figures of celestial stars

By the mid 16th century, Spanish colonization had brought a brutal end to the Taíno civilization, having wiped out between 80 to 90% of the indigenous population through genocide and foreign-brought diseases. Warfare, the encomienda system, and no resistance to Old World epidemic outbreaks, like smallpox, influenza, measles, and typhus decimated the Taíno population on the island, the first indigenous victims of Spanish colonization of the Americas. Survivors had no choice but to assimilate into the Spanish colony, with many Dominicans today carrying indigenous blood.  Over time, the mestizo children of the Spanish colonizers and Taíno concubines intermarried with West Africans after their arrival from the Trans-Atlantic slave trade, creating the tri-racial Creole culture found in the country today.

Gallery

Art during the Colonial era (1492-1821) 

Soon after Christopher Columbus first arrived at the island, a divergent art style was introduced in Santo Domingo, the first seat of European artistic influence in the "New World". During the colonial period, art was characterized by religious-themed pictorial productions of Catholic icons, although mostly imported from Spain. Moreover, it was sacred and essentially anonymous, being that the first artists and craftsmen were brought to the island for the ornamentation of the first temples.  According to the Marquis of Lozoya, there were three capital works during the 16th century in the colony; these include a mural painting representing a martyred saint held in the Treasury Room of the Catedral Primada; the magnificent copy of the Virgen de la Antigua, found in a chapel of the same Cathedral; and La Virgen de Cristóbal Colón, believed to be the oldest preserved portrait of Columbus and though painted in Santo Domingo, today it remains on display in Lázaro Galdiano Museum.

Of the three works mentioned, the most important is the Virgin de la Antigua, painted in Seville between 1520 and 1523. It was saved from a shipwreck in the vicinity of the Virgin Islands when it was brought by ship to Santo Domingo and considered the first large-format painting to arrive to the Americas, measuring at 2.85 meters in height by 1.75 wide.

Another imported though significant painting during the colonial period is Nuestra Señora de la Altragracia, held in the Basílica Catedral de Higüey. Considered the oldest preserved painting of the colony, it was brought to the island by two brothers, Alonso and Antonio de Trejo, from their home in Placencia, in the region of Extremadura in 1502. During this time, the sacred image of the Virgin Mary took on a special role in the colony and became represented by this painting. According to traditional legend, the Virgin de la Altagracia appeared beneath an orange tree in the town of Higüey, inspiring invocations and turning her into a national icon of the island. Since the early 1500s to the present day, Nuestra Señora de la Altragracia has been viewed as the maximum expression of the Marian cult for all Dominicans of Catholic faith. 

Overall, the Hispanic, Catholic and stately aesthetic, including a medieval-renaissance eclecticism, reflects the art of the period, and is above all expressed in the civil and religious architecture of Santo Domingo created during this time. The first century of Spanish colonialism didn't produce any mestizo art, considering Spanish exploitation was too severe. Moreover, during the 17th century, Hispaniola faced a period of isolation and general poverty, in which a creole mentality was beginning to be defined in the majority mixed population, in isolation, and in religious cults, like the Altagraciano, associated with offerings, miracles, veneration and the iconographic multiplicity of the maternal image.

The anonymity of early colonial painters is explained by the fact that the majority did not sign their works. No knowledge of other painters survive like artists Francisco Velásquez, painter of the Twelve Apostles displayed in the Cathedral Primada, and Diego José Hilaris, whose series of paintings cover miracles of the Virgin Mary that took place throughout the colony. Despite no specificities concerning their biography survive, we know they were criollos born on the island during the mid 1700s. Hilaris, painted his series, known as medallions for their shape, in the latter half of the 1700s; of the 27 whose existence is known, only 10 have been lost.  In the case of Velásquez, it is said that he was born in Santo Domingo in the last half of the 18th century and died between 1822 and 1830. With respect to Hilaris, it is believed that he was born in Higüey, between 1760 and 1778 with no estimated year of death.

Fundamentally, the artistic relevance of the colonial era lies in architecture, as Darío Suro points out. Construction needs generated by the founding of the new city resulted in a broad urban development that is exemplified in the Cathedral of Santo Domingo, the Fortaleza Ozama, the palace house of Diego Colón, more churches of sober construction such as the old convent of Las Mercedes in Santo Domingo; and other great, unique examples of colonial architecture in the Caribbean territory.

Gallery

19th Century - First Flourishing of the Arts 

Fine arts developed fairly late in Dominican Republic compared to many neighboring islands. Though during the 1870s, an unforeseen flowering began in the country. The repressive six-year period of the government of Buenaventura Báez ended; the threat of annexation to the United States disappeared after the bill is rejected in the Senate and repudiated by the Dominican people; and in the beginning of 1874, a Constituent Assembly is called to reform the fundamental Charter of the country. This reform and others that take place later, all liberal in nature, establish universal suffrage with a direct vote, although the vote was exclusive to only men. Development of trade and the emergence of modern, albeit small, industries contributed to an atmosphere of optimism for the country. A flourishing of the arts, letters, and overall educational and societal reform develop after the founding of various teaching centers and civic societies that promote the creation of artistic and literary works.

A whole generation of artists sprouted as Puerto Rican social theorist, Eugenio Maria de Hostos's influence on educational, intellectual, and moral issues proliferated throughout the Antilles. His teachings influenced many intellectuals and artists of the time. Alejandro Bonilla was one of the first Dominican painters of importance who, after his exile in Venezuela, returned to his native country in 1874 and dedicated himself to teaching art. His teaching coincided with the arrival of foreign artists to the island; a particular case of some importance was that of Spanish painter José Fernández Corredor from Madrid, who arrived in Santo Domingo in 1883 on his way to Colombia, proclaimed “But what a Spanish city!” and stayed.

During his three-year stay, he came to teach at the Dominican capital, teaching a group of future artists who met there and became interconnected, including Abelardo Rodríguez Urdaneta, Arturo Grullón, Luis Desangles, Leopoldo Navarro, Américo Lugo, Máximo Grullón, Arquímedes de la Concha, Ángel Perdomo, Adolfo García Obregón, Alfredo Senior, Ramón Mella Ligthgow, Adriana Billini, among others. For the first time in the country's arts, a generation of native sculptors, photographers and painters formed. They mainly offered artistic compositions marked by romanticism, pictorialism, and costumbrismo, with certain impressionist tints for historical, patriotic, religious, landscape, and portraiture matters.

A new artistic space already established during this time in Santo Domingo was the workshop of Luis Desangles, who soon transformed into a young teacher and host of intellectual gatherings, who attracted other individuals interested in artistic work, including some of the former disciples of Corredor like Rodríguez Urdaneta, Arturo Grullón,  de la Concha, García Obregón, as well as new names like Carlos Ramírez Guerra, and Francisco González Lamarche.

In 1886, when dictator Ulises Heureaux stole the presidential elections through blatant fraudulent means, defeating Casimiro de Moya (1849-1915), the democratic favorite and the country's representative of patriotic ideals, an armed uprising known as the Moya Revolution broke out in the Cibao, though subsequently squashed. The conflict had involved many young people of liberal views, as well as many intellectuals and artists. Heureaux perceived a conspiratorial movement against him that mostly involved disciples of de Hostos, which prompted the teacher to leave the country, truncating the positivist educational project that had brought about progress in the educational system and cultural life to the country.  Press articles fighting the dictatorship circulated in the capital city during the last decade of the nineteenth century, inspiring some students of Desangles to conceive of making several paintings in which the image of the dictator appeared dead by hanging.

 
One morning on the early days of February 1893 in Colón Park, at the foot of the colonizer's statue, a painting of President Heureaux hanging from a tree with his tongue sticking out was found. The resemblance was insurmountable and a large influx of onlookers gathered. Subsequent investigations led to the well-founded suspicion that this painting came from the workshop of Professor Desangles, eventually leading to the face to face confession of Archimedes de la Concha with Heureaux as the sole perpetrator of the act.  The visual execution of the dictator produced immediate consequences. The first was the expatriation of Luis Desangles, who was given 24 hours to leave the Republic. The second consequence was the closure of the painter's studio-school, his home space as a place for cultural gatherings and events, and the closure of the Municipal School that he directed. Another consequence was the planned execution of Arquímedes de la Concha, of which he was later sparred. Despite Heureaux's eventual further consolidation of the country's first modern dictatorship, artists, writers and intellectuals had by this moment ingrained in them a new romantic attitude, manifested in youthful and militant artistic activism.  In 1899 the dictator was assassinated in Moca.

Overall, the predominant styles of this era were pictorialist, realist, costumbrismo, neoclassical, impressionist, and romantic. The 19th century Dominican tendency of romantic art is mainly Antillean and, because of the politics of the era, national in its localist agenda. Other elements of the romantic tendency have to do with the surrounding nature, the still life and the traditional scene. This landscape is dominated by monotony, a melancholic atmosphere and of environmental loneliness, which is not an expression of the artist's feeling, but a condition of reality that is certainly desolate and poor. Dominican romanticism manifests passion for the homeland, admiration for great men, love for the land and for positively appreciated national symbols. The most influential, stand out names of this first generation include Bonilla, Desangles, Navarro, Grullón, and Rodriguez Urdaneta.

Gallery

20th Century - Modernism 
 
In the first decades of the 20th century, artistic styles passed down mostly unchanged to the artists considered part of the second generation of artists, which include Celeste Woss y Gil, Jaime Colson, Yoryi Morel, Dario Suro, Paul Giudicelli, Clara Ledesma, Ramón Oviedo, Guillo Pérez and Candido Bido, etc. These artists were the first to achieve true international success, exhibiting not only in Caribbean and Latin American countries, but also the United States and Europe. More art schools were also established across the country during this time, like Juan Bautista Gomez's art school established in Santiago de los Caballeros in 1920, teaching future artists like Joaquín Priego, Federico Izquierdo, and Yoryi Morel; Celeste Woss y Gil's art school studio in 1924 in Santo Domingo and a second one in 1931 after returning from New York; and Enrique Garcia-Godoy, who established an arts school in La Vega  in 1930. These three schools would later go on to influence the development of naturalism, costumbrismo, and pictorialist production on the island, among other styles. Moreover, after Rafael Trujillo assumes complete control of the Dominican government, a fascist dictatorship more or less a Caribbean sequel to the right-wing regimes that had developed in Europe, his soft spot for the arts led him to found the Escuela Nacional de Bellas Artes (National School of Fine Arts) and the museum La Primera Exposición Nacional de Artes Plásticas (First National Exhibition of Plastic Arts) in Santo Domingo in 1942.  The ENBA becomes the fundamental center for artistic training in the country. 

Beginning in 1939, European refugees mostly from Spain, arrived to Santo Domingo. The impact that the Republicans caused in the capital city was expressed in various ways, starting with the alteration of nightlife since the Spanish were used to everything at later hours; they founded cinemas, multiplied cafes, and established restaurants. In addition to nighttime recreation, the exiles also favorably influenced intellectual and university development, since many of them were academics, writers, and artists of various manifestations: musicians, theater players, sculptors, painters and craftsmen. With the Spanish Republicans and a good number of Central European Jews and other exiles, the population of the capital city increased relatively, but especially the cultural environment. Walking passed streets and cafes, in addition to peninsular Spanish and Dominican spanish, German and French were also heard. The small and secluded corner of the Caribbean became for some time a cosmopolitan place. The artists who resided in Santo Domingo during this time included: Josep Gausachs, Manolo Pascual, Juan Bautista Acher, Saul Steimberg, Kurt Schnitzer, George Hausdorf, José Vela Zanetti, Francisco Vásquez Díaz, Antonio Bernad Gonzálvez, Ernesto Lothar, Josep Rovira, Francisco Dorado, Mounia André, Joaquín de Alba, Hans Pape, Ana María Schwartz, Alejandro Solana Ferrer, and many others.

The legacy these Spanish and Central European refugees have on Dominican art is especially evident in the approach to avant-garde languages like surrealism and abstraction seen in the works of native artists in the later half of the 20th century. For example, the first generations of students in ENBA benefited from teachers such as Gausachs, Pascual, Vela Zanetti, Lothar and Hausdorf.

Impressionism and Expressionism

Impressionism as an artistic language has been present since the earliest days of national Dominican art, almost inseparable from naturalism, considering many naturalist artists painted with impressionistic tones and vice versa; between 1900 and 1940, these artists include Desangles, Juan Bautista Gómez, Celeste Woss y Gil, Delia Weber,  Enrique Garcia-Godoy, Yoryi Morel, Darío Suro, Federico Izquierdo, and Aída Ibarra; of them, Suro is known as the leading Dominican impressionist, while Morel is most well known as the representative of Dominican pictorialist costumbrismo. The more naturalist painters are considered to be Tuto Báez, Juana García de Concepción, Genoveva Báez, Rafael Arzeno, and Servio Certad. Painters from the 1950-1990 generation with impressionist tendencies are: Mario Grullón, Marianela Jiménez, Xavier Amiama, Nidia Serra, Jacinto Domínguez, Pluntarco Andújar, Rafi Vásquez, among others.

In the 1940s there was also Dominican Expressionism. Many artists of this era created expressionist as well as impressionist works, including Dario Suro, Delia Weber, and Yoryi Morel. Expressionism manifested itself as an artistic movement that opposes the external, superficial and illusory forms of Impressionism, its essential characteristic being the expression of internal sensations, internal motivation, and intimate passion. During the 1960s, the continuity of expressionism came from Gilberto Hernandez Ortega, Eligio Pichardo, Dario Suro, Jaime Colson, Silvano Lora, Paul Giudicelli, Ramon Oviedo, Clara Ledesma Guillo Perez, Jose Rincón Mora, Leopoldo Perez Lepe,  Xavier Amiama,  and Asdrubal Dominguez. During the 1960s Expressionism was the dominant art style but what distinguishes this second era of Dominican expressionism is a social agenda closely linked to the subversion and oppression that increased at the end of the Trujillo dictatorship, as well as the civic upheavals produced in the process that follows tyrannicide: armed uprising, poverty, and social exploitation; war and death become popular subjects for these social expressionists, evoked in an aesthetic clouded with a cold, dark, violent atmosphere and the deformation in the figurative representations and landscape.

Abstractionism

During the 1940s Dominican abstractionism emerged as a visual language with Neohumanist and Cubist Jaime Colson's neocubism, or colonial cubism, that expresses a Caribbean racial and tropical reality that contrasts Cubism's continental one. The cubist tendency that developed in Dominican art is that of the black Antillean world, "the intimate drama of the tormented life of man and through the music that elevates him from his religious rites", wrote Colson. The Colsonian neo-cubist style became a national trend during the 1950s and onwards, with more than one conscious imitator, mimetic or recreator appearing in each decade, like Paul Giudicelli, Dario Suro, Clara Ledesma, Rafael Faxas, Domingo Liz, Eligio Pichardo, and Dionisio Pichardo. Colonial cubism can also be appreciated as a Dominican, Caribbean and even Antillean style, since its aesthetic is assumed in several countries like Haiti, Puerto Rico, and other islands as a result of Colson's influence.

Moreover, In the 1950s and 1960s, expressionism, neocubist formulation and pure abstraction coincide in being artistic languages that are based on the emotionality expressed by the issuing subject. The three parallels drawn by these languages converge in the eclectic abstract expressionist that three important painters assume in Dominican painting: Eligio Pichardo, Guillo Pérez and Paul Giudicelli. Of these three, Giudicelli is the one who formally defined himself as an abstract expressionist. Other important artists that produced abstract works are Gilberto Hernandez Ortega, Dario Suro, Jacinto Dominguez,  Ada Balcear, Tito Canepa, Silvano Lora, Elsa Núñez, and Delia Weber, Fernando Peña Defilló, Norbeto Santana, Jose Perdomo, Clara Ledema, Dionisio Pichardo, and Luichy Martínez Richiez.

Surrealism

In 1941, the founder of Surrealism, Andre Breton, landed in Santo Domingo with his family, Cuban painter Wilfredo Lam, Russian writer Victor Serge, surrealist Pierre Mabille, and German communist writer Anna Seghers. Seeking refuge on the island away from the Second World War that was enveloping Europe, they stayed for a short time and regularly in the company of Eugenio Fernández Granell, the Spanish painter and predominant surrealist on the island. Just two years later, Granell would become one of the foundational creators of Poesia Sorprendida, the surrealist avant-garde literary magazine and movement in 1943. This year is considered the starting point of Dominican surrealism as a movement, since the presence of these major surrealists and the literary movement led to a rise of Dominican surrealists during the 1950s and succeeding decades.  The clearest and most perennially affiliated of these native surrealists is Jorge Noceda. His characteristics involve a focus on fleeting and virtual aspects of waking life,  associating many elements of nature (flowers, fruits, birds, ...) in dreamlike visions suggestive of fantasy and memory. Surrealism in the Dominican Republic had even more strong supporters who created unique works including Jaime Colson, Ivan Tovar, Gilberto Hernández Ortega, Luis Oscar Romero, and Jose Felix Moya. Other artists who produced works with touches of surreality are Dario Suro, Clara Ledesma, Tito Canepa, Eligio Pichardo, Dionisio Pichardo, and Hilario Rodriguez.

New Figuration or Nueva Figuración 

Nueva Figuracion or New Figuration was a revival of figurative art in Europe and America in the 1960s and 1970s following a period dominated by abstraction. The term Dominican New Figuration was coined by the critic and poet Jeannette Miller in 1972, of which she points out Fernando Peña Defilló, a principal abstract painter, as the artist who creates the conditions of what has been called Dominican New Figuration. After a long journey through Europe painting abstract and experimental works, he returns to the Antillean, tropic environment of his native country and proceeds to destroy the taboos of the traditional school of painting there. Another artist associated with the movement is Candido Bido. His style of Dominican neofigurativism centers paradise, floral, erotic, pictorial, lyrical, mythical, symbolic, dreamy, and terrestrial themes of the Dominican, Haitian, and Caribbean land. Danicel and Justo Susana are other important artists of this movement.

Island Pop Art

Pop art is a figurative art whose aesthetic is based on everyday consumerism and images that come from advertising, photography, television, and other mass media. The simple reproducible image, cold and without any contained emotion of pop art challenged the conventions of fine arts, rising in popularity with young artists during the 1960s and 70s. Daniel Henriquez is the most prominent Dominican pop artists, drawn by kitsch representations of the popular dwelling, equally Dominican and Antillian. Jorge Severino is another important artist associated with Dominican pop.

80's Generation
The generation of 1980 marked an extremely fruitful moment for artistic creation, vitally decisive for the reactivation of the imagination in Santo Domingo. Collective Generation 80, coined by Laura Gil,  were members of group of young graduates of the National School of Fine Arts between the late 1970s and early 1970s who revolved almost in unison around the goal for creative freedom, yet separated by multiple goals and ideas. The eighties are the only generation of artists that formed a militant cohesion, defined not as members in a group, but as a collective spirit, where the magical and surreal seems to assert itself with much greater emphasis than the expressionist. «Figurative and abstract, magical, hyperrealistic and surrealist influence . Their heads or leaders are: Gabino Rosario, Hamlet Rubio, Germán Olivares, Persio Checo, José Ramón Medina, Genaro Phillips, Hilario Olivo, Jorge Pineda, Belkis Ramírez, Tony Capellan, Gabino Rosario, Octavio Paniagua, Elvis Aviles, Luz Severino, Carlos Hinojosa, Dionisio Plubio de la Paz, Magdeleno Portorreal, to name a few.

Gallery

Art Museums in Dominican Republic
 Museo Alcazar Colón, Santo Domingo
 Museo de Arte Moderno, Santo Domingo
 Museo Arqueológico, Altos de Chavón
 Museo de Arte Folklórico Tomás Morel, Santiago
 Museo de Arte Taíno, Puerto Plata
 Museo de la Familia Dominicana, Santo Domingo
 Museo del Hombre Dominicano, Santo Domingo
 Centro León, Santiago de los Caballeros
 The Museo Bellapart, Santo Domingo

External links
 Galeria de Arte Domincana to find more information on Dominican painters

References

Dominican Republic art
Dominican Republic culture
Art by country